Ulhas Asnodkar is an Indian politician. He was elected to the Goa Legislative Assembly from Aldona in the 1999 Goa Legislative Assembly election as a member of the Bharatiya Janata Party. He was Deputy Speaker of the Goa Legislative Assembly from December 1999 to February 2002.

References

1955 births
Living people
Members of the Goa Legislative Assembly
Deputy Speakers of the Goa Legislative Assembly
People from Porvorim
Goa MLAs 1999–2002
Bharatiya Janata Party politicians from Goa